Dominique Xardel is an author and marketing professor in France.

From 1978–1988, Xardel was director of ESSEC Business School He was Editor in Chief of the Harvard L'Expansion, the French version of the Harvard Business Review. As of 2005, he was Associate Dean for International Affairs at ESSEC. He holds a Doctorate degree from the University of Paris IX-Dauphine. Xardel worked for businesses such as Unilever and Time Inc before joining ESSEC, and he has taught at Geneva Business School in Switzerland. Xardel has authored various books on marketing

References

External links
Dominique Xardel, faculty page at ESSEC

Business writers
French non-fiction writers
French businesspeople
Living people
Year of birth missing (living people)
Unilever people
French male non-fiction writers